Commodity Futures Trading Commission (CFTC) Act of 1974 (P.L. 93-463) created the Commodity Futures Trading Commission, to replace the U.S. Department of Agriculture's Commodity Exchange Authority, as the independent federal agency responsible for regulating the futures trading industry.  The Act made extensive changes in the basic authority of Commodity Exchange Act of 1936, which itself had made extensive changes in the original Grain Futures Act of 1922.  (7 U.S.C. 1 et seq.).

The H.R. 13113 legislation was passed by the 93rd U.S. Congressional session and signed into law by the 38th President of the United States Gerald Ford on October 23, 1974.

References

United States federal agriculture legislation
United States federal commodity and futures legislation
1974 in law
93rd United States Congress